Moto G7 (stylized by Motorola as moto g7) is a series of Android smartphones developed by Motorola Mobility, a subsidiary of Lenovo. It is the seventh generation of the Moto G family and was first released on 7 February 2019. As with the last generations which introduced the Plus and Play variants, this series has introduced the Power variant as well. There are four variants in the seventh series.

Release 
The G7 was announced on February 7, 2019; it was released on the same day in the Brazil and Mexico markets. It was released on August 30, 2019, in Canada.  It was due to be released in the European market on March 1, 2019, however this was delayed until the 15th for unknown reasons. It was due to be released in United States, Australia and Asia after Europe, however no dates had been announced.

The G7 was released in India on March 25, 2019, at a launch price of INR₹17,825 (US$247), alongside an Android Onepowered phone, the Motorola One. The other variants of the G7 had yet to be released.

The G7 Power was released in Australia, exclusive to mobile carrier Telstra on April 30, 2019. Gizmodo criticized Telstra's contract pricing for the phone, with the cheapest option costing AU$1,416 over 24 months, despite the price of AU$349 to buy it outright.

The G7 Plus is not available in the United States.

Variants

G7 
The G7 carries some of the special features of the Plus, while also being on par with the budget G7 Play in other departments. It features a single small notch on the top of the display for the front facing camera, this does mean it doesn't carry a front facing flash like the G6 did.

G7 Play 
The G7 Play is the least expensive variant of this generation. It has the widest notch in comparison with the other variants, and this means it is the only one with front facing flash. Moto boasts that it has a 60% performance increase compared to the last generation. In the previous generation, its selling feature was the largest battery capacity, 4000 mAh. However, this has been reduced to 3000 mAh. In contrast with other variants, it runs a 32-bit version of the Android operating system.

G7 Plus 

The Plus has not seen many changes from the previous generation. The largest would be the notch and the lack of a front facing camera LED flash. It can now also charge at 27W instead of 15W using the TurboPower Charger, it has stereo speakers, optical image stabilisation and Bluetooth 5.0, however it also has a reduced battery capacity of 3000 mAh instead of 3200 mAh.

G7 Power 

The last-generation G6 Play had a large battery and less powerful specifications, however the G7 Power took this role. The other three models have a 3000 mAh battery, the Power has 5000 mAh. The other specifications fall between those of the G7 Play and G7.

Specifications 
Some specifications such as wireless technologies and storage will vary between regions.
Previously only the Play had its fingerprint scanner on the rear. Due to the larger screen, the fingerprint scanner is now located on the rear of all the phones. Additionally, all G7 variants now have a cutout, or notch, at the top of the screen.

References 

Android (operating system) devices
Mobile phones introduced in 2019
Mobile phones with multiple rear cameras
Motorola smartphones